Erasmus University Rotterdam (abbreviated as EUR) is a public research university located in Rotterdam, Netherlands. The university is named after Desiderius Erasmus Roterodamus, a 15th-century humanist and theologian.

Erasmus MC is the largest and one of the foremost academic medical centers and trauma centers in the Netherlands, whereas its economics and business school, Erasmus School of Economics and Rotterdam School of Management are well known in Europe and beyond. Currently, Erasmus University Rotterdam has been placed in the top 100 universities in the world by four prominent international ranking tables. In 2017, the university was ranked by Times Higher Education as 69th in the world with its business & economics as 17th, and clinical health as 42nd in the world, and was ranked among top ten business schools in Europe by the Financial Times. In 2015, Erasmus University Rotterdam was ranked by Times Higher Education as 20th in Europe and 72nd in the world, with its social sciences as 40th, and clinical health as 35th in the world.

The university has seven faculties and focuses on the following four areas:
Health – Faculty of Medicine and Health Sciences/Erasmus MC and Erasmus School of Health Policy & Management (ESHPM)
Wealth – Erasmus School of Economics and Rotterdam School of Management
Governance – Erasmus School of Law and Erasmus School of Social and Behavioural Sciences (ESSB)
Culture –  Erasmus School of History, Culture and Communication, Erasmus School of Social and Behavioural Sciences (ESSB) and Erasmus School of Philosophy (ESPhil)

History

Erasmus University Rotterdam was founded on 8 November 1913 as the Netherlands School of Commerce (or NHH) through private initiative with broad support from the business community of Rotterdam. In 1937, the school was recognized as a higher educational institute with university status, providing education in commerce and economics as an academic discipline. This resulted in a change of its name: the NHH became the NEH, or Netherlands School of Economics. The growing complexity of society led in the 1960s, to the arrival of the faculties of Law and Social Sciences, followed in later decades by Philosophy, History and Arts, and Business Administration.

From 1950, the Foundation for Higher Clinical Education used its best efforts to get a full academic medical study programme established in Rotterdam, and with success: In 1966, the government established the Medical Faculty Rotterdam, housed next to Dijkzigt Hospital. Together with the Sophia Children's Hospital and the Daniel den Hoed Clinic, it forms the University Hospital Rotterdam, which as of 1 January 2003, bears the name Erasmus MC.
In 1973, the Medical Faculty Rotterdam and the Netherlands School of Economics merged, after which the institution was renamed under its current name Erasmus University Rotterdam – the first university in the Netherlands named after a person, a man to whom Rotterdam owes the reputation it has held for centuries in the academic world.

Health
This domain includes the Erasmus MC, the Erasmus School of Health Policy and Management (ESHPM) and the Institute for Medical Technology Assessment (iMTA).

Erasmus MC is the new name for the university medical centre in Rotterdam, which is a merger of the Faculty of Medicine and Health Sciences and the University Hospital Rotterdam (Dijkzigt, Sophia, Daniel den Hoed clinic). The biomedical cluster plays a leading role in the field of analysis of role of individual genes playing role in diseases. The Forensic Molecular Biology department works together with the Netherlands Forensic Institute (NFI). Major long-term genetic epidemiological studies among the elderly and children are Erasmus Rotterdam Health for the Elderly (ERGO) and Generation R respectively.
The Erasmus School of Health Policy and Management (ESHPM) forms a bridge between medicine and the health sciences on the one hand and social sciences on the other. The institute for Medical Technology Assessment (iMTA) conducts health economic research in collaboration with both the Erasmus MC and the Erasmus School of Health Policy and Management.

Wealth

This area includes the Erasmus School of Economics and the Rotterdam School of Management. Its economics programmes and management programmes attract students and postgraduates from all over the world.
The research schools Erasmus Institute for Management (ERIM) and the Tinbergen Institute attract PhD students, research fellows, PostDocs and visiting professors of repute from all corners of the world.
Other joint ventures are the English-language programme International Business Administration, the Erasmus Executive Development programme (EED) and the Erasmus University Centre for Contract Research and Business Support (ERBS).

Governance
The research focuses on the organisation of business and society. This area has ground in common not only with economics and management, but also with medicine and health sciences.

Culture

As one of four concentrations of Erasmus University, culture is defined broadly with focus on the areas of media, cultural economics, and the high arts. Primary research is on society and the arts, including cultural policy, media, and social identity in modern society. Faculty has particular strengths in research, and the students tend to graduate with strong research skills for both academic and field placement.

Research Institutes/Schools

Wealth
 Erasmus Research Institute of Management
The Erasmus Research Institute of Management (ERIM) is the joint research institute of the Rotterdam School of Management and the Erasmus School of Economics, both at Erasmus University Rotterdam. It aims to bring together top researchers in business and management.

 Econometric Institute
Erasmus University today is seen as the leading university in Econometrics and Operational Research. Jan Tinbergen, Nobel Prize winner for Economics (1969), and Henri Theil founded the Econometric Institute and influenced both Econometrics & Management Science. Tinbergen's theories also had a political inclination, with multiple objectives of price stability and employment and policies to achieve the desired results and stabilizing the economy.

 Tinbergen Institute (TI)
The Tinbergen Institute is a joint institute for research and education in economics, econometrics and finance of the University of Amsterdam, the VU University Amsterdam and the Erasmus University Rotterdam. It is one of the top research institutes and graduate schools in economics and finance in the world. It offers a research master program (MPhil) in economics and finance as well as PhD opportunities.

 Transport, Infrastructure and Logistics (TRAIL) 
In association with TU Delft, the TRAIL Research School is the Dutch national research school active in the fields of Transport, Infrastructure, and Logistics.

 Erasmus Centre for Entrepreneurship (ECE)

Health

 Cardiovascular Research School Erasmus University Rotterdam (COEUR)
 Netherlands Institute for Health Sciences (NIHES)
 Postgraduate School Molecular Medicine (MM)
 Medical Genetics Centre South-West Netherlands (MGC)
MGC participates in the top Research School Centre for Developmental and Biomedical Genetics

 Helmholtz School for Autonomous Systems Research

Law, Culture and Society
 Institute for Sales and Account Management
 International Institute of Social Studies
 Research School Public Safety
 Netherlands Institute of Government (NIG)
 Huizinga Instituut
 N.W. Posthumus Instituut
 Amsterdam School of Social-Public Research (ASSR)
 Research School Rights of the human
 Experimental Psychologic Researchschool (EPOS)
 Kurt Lewin Institute
 Research School of Ethics

Campus

The University has campuses at five locations, of which four in Rotterdam and one in The Hague:

 Campus Woudestein (main university location near Rotterdam-Kralingen)
 Campus Hoboken (Erasmus MC location near Rotterdam-Dijkzigt)
 Location EUC (Erasmus University College in Rotterdam Center)
 Location ISS (International Institute of Social Studies located in The Hague Center)
 Location ECE (Erasmus Centre for Entrepreneurship near Rotterdam-Delfshaven)

Sustainability
On 9 September 2009 ("Sustainability Day"), GreenEUR was launched officially. During this day, GreenEUR organized several on-campus activities in cooperation with Greening the Campus. Since April 2010 GreenEUR is officially recognized by the Executive Board.

Student activities
 In Duplo – Student Association for double degree students
 Economic Faculty Association Rotterdam
STAR Student Association Rotterdam School of Management
STAR Management Week
Erasmus Consultancy Project
 FAECTOR – official school association Erasmus School of Economics
 Econometric Career Days
 Erasmus debating society – oldest debating society in the Netherlands 
 Erasmus Centre for Entrepreneurship 
 Erasmus Magazine
 EUCSA – Student Association EUC Campus, Liberal Arts & Sciences
 Investment Week & Symposium
 Student Investment Society B&R Beurs

Rankings

Erasmus School of Economics
 Economics Department

The economics faculty is, according to the QS World University Rankings 2018, the 9th best in Europe (UK included) and 50th in the world in economics and econometrics, and 37th in the world in accounting and finance (10th best in Europe).

Times Higher Education World University Rankings ranks Erasmus University 1st in the Netherlands, 7th in Europe and 28th in the world for the subject Economics and Business in 2020.

The Shanghai Jiao Tong University Academic Ranking of World Universities published in 2018, lists Erasmus School of Economics as 9th in Europe and 32nd in the world in the fields of economics and business.

According to US News 2022, Erasmus University Rotterdam ranked 1st in the Netherlands, 2nd in Europe and 10th in the world for Economics and Business.

Rotterdam School of Management
The Financial Times European Business School Rankings  as well as the Global MBA rankings  consistently lists RSM as top 10 in Europe. The Financial Times ranked the CEMS MSc in International Management offered by Rotterdam School of Management, Erasmus University as third in the world in 2022. QS ranked the school's MSc Global Business & Sustainability program among the top 60 in the world in the 2023 International Trade Rankings.

 Accreditations

The business school has achieved triple accreditation from the international accrediting bodies of management education; AMBA, EQUIS, and AACSB. Only 100 business schools in the world have acquired triple accreditation, although many schools have a policy of not applying for multiple accreditations.

Erasmus Medical Center

The Erasmus MC (university medical center) is considered by several major rankings to be a global top institution for clinical medicine, i.e. ranked in the world as 45th in 2020 by Times Higher Education World University Rankings, as 28th in 2020 by U.S. News & World Report Best Global University Ranking and 50th in 2019 by QS World University Rankings.

Furthermore, the Erasmus MC is listed by The Scientist as the fifth-best of the top 15 medical institutions outside the United States (ranking 2004).

Education

Undergraduate programmes
Erasmus University Rotterdam offers a broad range of Bachelor's programmes taught in the Dutch language, leading to a B.A., BSc or LL.B. degree

Furthermore, the university offers several completely English-language Bachelor programmes. These programmes are open to students aiming for an international career in Business and/or Economics or Communication and Media. Apart from the Dutch students, about 40% of the students taking these programmes are international students from over 80 countries.

Graduate Studies
Students can choose from different types of Master programmes: (common) Master programmes, Research Master programmes or Post-experience Master programmes. Education at this level is given mostly in English.

Master’s programmes
These type of Master's programmes lead to a M.A., MSc or LL.M. degree.

Research Master’s programmes
Talented graduates are given the opportunity to utilise their skills and potential in academic research. To be eligible for a Research Master, a bachelor's or master's degree must have been obtained.

Post-experience and professional Master's programmes
The university also offers specialised knowledge and skills programmes for further development of one's professional career. These types of programmes leads to the commonly known M.A. or MSc, but also to professional master's degree's like MBA, MFM (Master in Financial Management), or MHM:

Doctorate programmes

Research doctorates 
In addition, most departments, affiliated (research) institutes or faculties offer doctorate programs or positions, leading to the 'Doctor of Philosophy' (PhD) degree. Most of the PhD programs offered by the university are concentrated in several research schools or institutes.

Erasmus Honours Academy
Erasmus University offers special honours programmes.

Students are invited to take part if their first-year grades are well above average and if they have proved themselves to be sufficiently motivated.  The programmes are either disciplinary: special programmes for the very best students of one departments, or interdisciplinary: one of the Erasmus Honours Programme-tracks, where the very best students of the different faculties of the Erasmus University investigate, discuss, and tackle crucial contemporary scientific and societal questions from various perspectives.

After successfully completing the honours-programme, students receive a Honours-certificate and a Letter of Recommendation from the dean of their respective Faculty, or the Rector Magnificus of the EUR.

Notable staff

Nobel Memorial Prize in Economic Sciences laureates
Jan Tinbergen (recipient of the inaugural prize in 1969)

Guido Imbens (recipient in 2021)

Politics
Jan Peter Balkenende (former Prime Minister of the Netherlands)
Pim Fortuyn (politician)
Alexander Rinnooy Kan (former president of the Dutch Social-Economic Council)
Jo Ritzen (former Dutch Minister of Education, Culture and Science; alumnus as well)
Cees Veerman (former Dutch Minister of Agriculture, Nature and Food Quality)

Business
Hans Wijers (former CEO of AkzoNobel; former Dutch Minister of Economic Affairs)

Scientists
Eelco van Asperen (computer scientist)
Klaas Bom (medical engineer and inventor of the portable ultrasound scanner)
Michael Braungart (chemist holding the Cradle-to-Cradle chair)
Frank Grosveld (molecular biologist, recipient of Spinoza Prize in 1995)
Jan Hoeijmakers (molecular biologist, recipient of Spinoza Prize in 1998)
Albert Osterhaus (virologist and influenza expert; head of the National Influenza Centre, and head of the world reference center for measles of the World Health Organization)
Gerrit van Poelje (founder of the Public Administration in the Netherlands)
Mihir Rakshit (economist known for his work on fiscal and monetary policy related to the developing economy)
Henri Theil (successor of Jan Tinbergen; together with Jan Tinbergen founder of the Econometric Institute in 1956)

Philosophy
Luce Irigaray (feminist theorist)

Notable alumni

Head of states
 Jelle Zijlstra (former Prime Minister of the Netherlands, former President of De Nederlandsche Bank)
 Ruud Lubbers (former Dutch Prime Minister and UN High Commissioner)
 Meles Zenawi (former prime minister of the Federal Democratic Republic of Ethiopia)
 Mohammad Hatta (a proclamator of Indonesia's independence, 1st vice-president and prime minister of the Republic of Indonesia)

Business leaders
 Maarten Fontein (former CEO, AFC Ajax)
 Cor Herkströter (former chairman Royal Dutch Shell, President Commissioner of the ING Group)
 Frans Muller (CEO,  Ahold Delhaize Group)
 Frans van Houten (CEO, Philips)
 David Knibbe (CEO, NN Group)
 Steven van Rijswijk (CEO, ING Group)
 Robert Swaak (CEO, ABN AMRO)
  Piet Moerland (CEO, Rabobank)
 Peter Hartman (CEO, KLM)
 Martin van Rijn (CEO,  PGGM Pension Fund)
  Pieter Korteweg (CEO, Robeco)
 Ronald Wuijster (CEO,  APG)
 Marco Keim (CEO,  Aegon the Netherland)
 Peter Bakker (CEO, TNT N.V.)
 Bart Becht (CEO, Reckitt Benckiser)
 Johan H. Andresen Jr. (CEO, Ferd)
 Hans Wijers (former CEO of AkzoNobel) 
 Jeroen van der Veer (Chairman of Philips, former CEO of Royal Dutch Shell)
 Henri Termeer (former president, CEO and chairman of Genzyme) 
 Feike Sijbesma (CEO, DSM N.V.)

Economists and Researchers
 Jan Tinbergen (first winner of the Nobel Memorial Prize in Economic Sciences)
 Nout Wellink (former President of De Nederlandsche Bank)
 Peter Nijkamp (professor of regional economics, recipient of the Spinoza Prize in 1996)
 Radius Prawiro (governor of Central Bank of Indonesia)
 Albert Winsemius (long-time economic advisor to Singapore)
 Stijn Claessens (head of financial stability policy department of the Bank for International Settlements)
 Antoine van Agtmael (former economist of the World Bank; coined the term emerging markets)
 Supachai Panitchpakdi (WTO Director-General, 2002–2005)
 Johan Witteveen (managing director IMF, 1973–1978 and first chairman of the Group of Thirty)

Politicians
 Onno Ruding (former vice-chairman, Citibank; former board member, ABN AMRO; former Minister of Finance in the Netherlands; former executive director of the IMF)
 Herman Heinsbroek (former Minister of Economic Affairs; founder, Arcade Records)
 Sumitro Djojohadikusumo (former Indonesian Minister of Finance) 
 Eduard Bomhoff (former Dutch Minister of Health, Welfare and Sport and Deputy Prime Minister)
 Frans Weisglas (former president of the House of Representatives of the Netherlands)
 Jan Kees de Jager (former Dutch Minister of Finance)
 Jan Pronk (former Minister for Development Cooperation and Minister of Housing, Spatial Planning and the Environment)
 Cees Veerman (former Minister of Agriculture, Nature and Food Quality)
 Jan Pronk (former Dutch minister and UN Special Representative)
 Lilianne Ploumen (former minister for Foreign Trade and Development Cooperation 2012–2017; member House of Representatives; studied social history)
 Ronald van Raak (member House of Representatives of the Netherlands and non-fiction writer; studied social history and philosophy)
 Neelie Kroes (former European Commissioner)
 Zoran Jolevski (former Macedonian Ambassador to the United States and negotiator of Macedonia naming dispute)
 Paul Zimmerman (councillor, Hong Kong's Southern District Council)
 Melanie Schultz van Haegen (former Minister of Infrastructure and the Environment)
 Yurii Lubkovych (former Secretary of State of the Ministry of Internal Affairs of Ukraine)
 Aart Jan de Geus (former deputy secretary-general of the OECD and former Minister of Social Affairs and Employment of the Netherlands)

Others
 Maria Oudeman, Dutch businesswoman and former President of Utrecht University (MBA, joint with University of Rochester, New York)
 Prince Johan-Friso of Orange-Nassau (2nd son of Queen Beatrix of the Netherlands)
 Drs. P (singer and writer)
 Frank Slootman (tech billionaire, CEO, Snowflake Inc., former CEO of ServiceNow)
 Stefan Aartsen (former Dutch butterfly swimmer)
 Marianne Thieme (well known Dutch animal activist and politician)
 Fatima Moreira de Melo (former Dutch field hockey international)
 Jacques Cohen (embryologist, director at reprogenetics)
 Maria Lynn Ehren (Miss Universe Thailand 2017)
 Samuel Kofi Woods (Liberian human rights activist and journalist)
 Ferry Sonneville (former Indonesian badminton player)

References

External links

Erasmus University Rotterdam
Erasmus University Rotterdam datasets

 
Educational institutions established in 1913
Universities in the Netherlands
1913 establishments in the Netherlands